The Joseon Industrial Exhibition was a colonial fair held to mark the 5th anniversary of the establishment of Japanese Korea, and was the first official event of the new government held in Gyeongseong (Seoul).

Location and buildings
The exhibition was held in the grounds of the Gyeongbokgung palace and took place in both existing buildings, and newly constructed ones.

The layout was designed to contrast old/Korean architecture with modern/Japanese architecture, with, for example, visitors entering through the existing Gwanghwamun gate, then seeing the new Illhogwan (First Exhibition Hall), which stood in front of the Geunjeongjeon throne room.

Contents
There were over 40,000 exhibits, mainly Japanese and Korean, with some Taiwanese exhibits. There were agricultural objects in Illhogwan, and further objects in the Kigyegwan (Machinery) and the Ch'amgogwan (Reference) halls.

Visitors
Over 1 million people attended the exhibition before it closed on 31 October 1915.

See also
 Japan–British Exhibition (1910)

Further reading

 Park, Young-Sin. 2019. The Chosŏn Industrial Exposition of 1915. PhD thesis: State University of New York.

References

1915 disestablishments in Asia
1910s establishments in Korea
1915 establishments in the Japanese colonial empire
20th-century disestablishments in Korea
1915 in the Japanese colonial empire
1910s in Seoul
Colonial exhibitions
World's fairs in Korea